The Girl in a Swing is a 1988 American supernatural erotic drama film directed by Gordon Hessler and starring Meg Tilly, Rupert Frazer, Nicholas Le Prevost, and Elspet Gray. Based on the 1980 novel The Girl in a Swing by Richard Adams, the film is about an English antique dealer who travels to Copenhagen where he meets and falls in love with a mysterious German-born secretary, whom he marries. Knowing nothing about her family or background, he soon discovers a darker side to his new bride.

Plot
Alan Desland (Rupert Frazer) is an English antique dealer who specializes in ceramics. A solitary man, he is a bachelor with no romantic ties. On a business trip to Copenhagen, he hires a German-born secretary, Karin Foster (Meg Tilly), to do some clerical work—she is fluent in English, Danish, and German. Alan's attraction to Karin is immediate, and over the coming days, he falls deeply in love with her. Karin is an attractive, sensuous, and mysterious woman who reveals little about herself. Her actions reflect both a quiet sensitivity (crying during a classical concert) and a dispassionate coldness (breaking the neck of an injured seagull). During a conversation about Karin's unmarried friend Inge and her child, Alan makes an offhand comment that he would have trouble marrying a woman with a child—the remark clearly upsets her. Before leaving Copenhagen, Karin expresses her love for Alan, who responds by proposing marriage, and Karin accepts.

Alan returns to England and meets with his mother, who expresses concern that they know very little about Karin's family or background. When Karin arrives, Alan begins to notice her strange behavior—frightened by the sound of children and fearful of the dark. As they prepare for their wedding, Karin states she cannot be married in a church. Karin's playful sensuality, however, overwhelms and enchants Alan. Alan and Karin soon travel to the United States on holiday and get married in a civil ceremony in Florida, where they spend their honeymoon. While swimming in a lake, Karin sees a body beneath the water, but Alan confirms it's only an old log.

When Alan and Karin return to England, she continues to captivate him and their entire social circle, engaging in discussions of philosophy and religion. At one dinner party, she asks Alan's best friend and vicar, "Can anything be forgiven?" He tells her yes, if a person truly wants to be forgiven. Alan suspects there is something deep and troubling in her—some dark secret or hidden guilt.

One day at an auction, Karin bids on an odd lot that contains a rare statuette of a girl in a swing. Overjoyed at the find, Alan authenticates the piece at Sotherby's which estimates its value at over £200,000. He becomes even happier when the initial impotence of his wedding night gives way to an unbridled sexuality between the two. In conversations with Alan and the vicar, Karin explores the connection between spiritual love and physical love—a notion she believes is absent in Christianity but embraced by pagan cults. Soon after, Karin tells Alan she is pregnant.

Alan's initial joy is offset by strange events and apparitions. He sees a green tortoise toy appear and then disappear, and he hears a child's voice on the phone—something Karin also hears. Karin tells Alan she wants to receive Holy Communion. At Mass she is disturbed by the vicar's sermon on the commandment against killing, and then at the communion railing, she takes the eucharist in her hand, but does not receive it, and soon collapses. At home Alan tries to reassure her that whatever's past is past, but she says, "Nothing is past." Karin continues to hear a child crying in the garden.

When Mrs. Taswell comes to deliver letters, Alan also hears the child crying in the garden. They go to investigate and find a doll faced down in the water fountain. Alan returns to find Karin hysterical. Realizing she knows what is causing these strange events, Alan shuts all the doors and windows, and closes the drapes, but the cries continue in the garden during a violent storm. Alan sees the green tortoise toy again in the bedroom.

The next day, Karin asks Alan to take her away. Before leaving, he discovers the receipt for the green tortoise toy and realizes to his horror that she bought it for her daughter just before killing her, out of fear that Alan would reject her with a child. Realizing the damage caused by his "careless words" in Copenhagen, Alan cries out, "May God have mercy." They drive to the beach, where she walks into the surf. She pours water over her head in a gesture of baptism, and he tells her he knows what she did. She takes her clothes off, hands him her wedding ring, and they make love on the beach. As the waves roll over them, she faints in his arms.

At the hospital, Alan watches over her, hearing her last words in German, "I had no pity." The next day he is told she died during the night. The doctor confirms she had an ectopic pregnancy, and that she had previously given birth. At an inquest hearing, while giving testimony, Alan sees an apparition of Karin in a hooded cloak at the back of the courtroom. When he realizes it is just an apparition, he breaks down in tears. Haunted by his careless words, Alan understands that his "need for a tidy life" resulted in the tragedy. When he returns home, he hears Karin in the garden, and walks out to find her on the swing.

Cast

 Meg Tilly as Karin
 Rupert Frazer as Alan
 Nicholas Le Prevost as The Vicar
 Elspet Gray as Mrs. Desland
 Lynsey Baxter as Barbara
 Jean Boht as Mrs. Taswell
 Hanne Borchsenius as Jytte Borgen
 Ljuba Castot as Child in Water
 Helen Cherry as Lady Alice
 Mogens Dalsgaard as Concert Pianist
 Su Elliot as Nurse
 June Ellis as Lady at Auction
 Patrick Godfrey as Coroner
 Lorna Heilbron as Flick

 Ebbe Langberg as Per Simonsen
 Preston Lockwood as Man at Sothebys
 Leonard Maguire as Dr. Frazer
 William 'Duke' Meeks as Mr. Steinberg
 Michael Melia as Policeman 1
 Trine Michelsen as Receptionist
 Hilary Minster as Joe
 Klaus Pagh as Man at La Cocotte
 Jan Petersen as Chef at La Cocotte
 Martin Selway as Policeman 2
 Claire Shepherd as Angela
 Axel Strøbye as Jarl Borgen
 Sophie Thursfield as Deirdre
 Ralph Wade as Auctioneer

Reception

Box office
The Girl in a Swing earned $747,013 gross in the United States.

Critical response
The film received mixed reviews. In a review in the Chicago Sun-Times, Roger Ebert gave The Girl in a Swing two and a half stars, writing, "I would have appreciated some kind of resolution to the story—instead of the confusion into which it eventually disappears." Ebert singled out Tilly's  performance as noteworthy, "If the movie is disappointing, it is not uninteresting. This is Tilly's second role recently as a mesmerizing woman—after the underrated Masquerade—and she creates a genuinely original performance, a woman sometimes dreamy, sometimes intense, and always in pain. It's a performance so good it deserves a better movie."

In her review in AllRovi, Linda Rasmussen wrote, "The film is not entirely successful due to the leisurely direction of Gordon Hessler and the lack of pace needed to create genuine suspense. But despite this flaw, the sensitive performance of Meg Tilly makes the film well worth watching and is a haunting psychological exploration of obsession, passion and guilt."

References

External links
 
 

1988 films
1980s erotic films
1988 fantasy films
1980s mystery films
1988 romantic drama films
1980s supernatural films
American erotic films
American fantasy films
American mystery films
American romantic drama films
American supernatural films
American erotic drama films
Erotic fantasy films
Films about murderers
Films based on British novels
Films directed by Gordon Hessler
Films scored by Carl Davis
Films set in Copenhagen
Films set in England
Films set in Florida
Supernatural drama films
1980s English-language films
1980s American films